Clear Boggy Creek, also known as the Clear Boggy River, is a  creek in southeastern Oklahoma that is a tributary of Muddy Boggy Creek.

Geography
According to some sources, Clear Boggy Creek joins with Muddy Boggy Creek to form the Boggy River.  Federal topographic maps and the Geographic Names Information System show Clear Boggy Creek as a tributary to Muddy Boggy Creek, which retains its name below the confluence.

Its gradient is about 15 feet per mile near its headwaters and 3 feet per mile near Boggy Depot and below.

Water in Clear Boggy Creek is more mineralized than in Muddy Boggy Creek.

History
Boggy Depot was established on Clear Boggy Creek.

References

External links
 Clear Boggy Watershed
 Oklahoma Digital Maps: Digital Collections of Oklahoma and Indian Territory

Rivers of Oklahoma
Rivers of Atoka County, Oklahoma
Tributaries of the Red River of the South